The Passaic Street Bridge  is a vehicular bridge crossing the Passaic River in Passaic and Garfield, New Jersey. The girder bridge was built in 1898 and is the third to span the river at that point. It is considered eligible for listing on the New Jersey Register of Historic Places and National Register of Historic Places.

See also
 List of crossings of the Lower Passaic River
 List of crossings of the Hackensack River
 1903 New Jersey hurricane

References

Bridges over the Passaic River
Bridges completed in 1898
Road bridges in New Jersey
Garfield, New Jersey
Buildings and structures in Passaic, New Jersey
Bridges in Bergen County, New Jersey
Bridges in Passaic County, New Jersey
Steel bridges in the United States
Girder bridges in the United States